Anthela brunneilinea is a moth of the Anthelidae family. It is found on the Kei Islands.

References

Moths described in 1924
Anthelidae